SixDegrees is a monthly published free English language magazine in Finland. It focuses on multicultural events, people, matters and phenomena.

See also
 List of Finnish magazines
 Helsinki Times

References

2003 establishments in Finland
Cultural magazines
English-language magazines
Free magazines
Magazines established in 2003
Magazines published in Helsinki
Monthly magazines published in Finland